Dharamsagar is a village in Nuapada district in the state of Odisha in India.

Geography

Dharamsagar is located on the Bhawanipatna–Raipur Highway (353 / SH-16) north of Khariar.

Population
According to the 2011 Census of India, there were 181 households in Dharamsagar, with a total population of 669.

References 

Villages in Nuapada district